Chinedkeran is a traditional open-deck boat of the Ivatan people from the island of Itbayat in the Philippines. It is similar in size to the falua, with five to thirteen pairs of rowers and a single sail. It is characteristically wide with high strakes due to the rough seas surrounding Itbayat.

See also
Avang
Chinarem
Tataya
Balangay
Bangka

References

Indigenous ships of the Philippines